Walter Hoyt (also seen as Haite, Hayte, Hoit, Haight) (September 6, 1618 – 1698) was a founding settler of Norwalk, Connecticut. He served as a deputy of the General Court of the Connecticut Colony from Norwalk between 1658 and 1662, and, when it was renamed, as a deputy of the Connecticut General Assembly between 1662 and 1681. He was a Norwalk selectman in 1672.

Early life
He was the son of Simon Haite (1595–1657) and Deborah Stowers. He came to America in 1628, with his father and brother, Nicholas Hoyt (b. 1620), at the age of ten.

Career
In 1640, he was known to own about 64 acres of land in Windsor, Connecticut Colony. In 1653, Walter came to Norwalk, among the first settlers.

He served in the General Court of the Connecticut Colony in the sessions of October 1658, May and October 1661, May and October 1667, October 1668, May 1670, May 1671, May 1672, October 1673, October 1674, May 1676, May 1678, and October 1681.

In May 1672, Walter Hoyte was among those whose names were given to the General Court "for the beginning of a plantation neare the backside of Norwalke."

He, along with Ralph Keeler, was contracted by the settlement to cut the timber and build a house for Reverend Thomas Hanford.

He voted in the town meetings in Norwalk, and was confirmed by the General Court as one of the proprietors of Norwalk in 1685.

Personal life
His first wife is unknown. After her death, he married Rhoda Tinker Hobbs Taylor (1611–1698) in 1653 in Windsor, Connecticut. He and Rhoda had one child, Zerubbabel Hoyt. His other three children were from his previous marriage.

 John Hoyt (1644–1711), who married Mary Lindall, daughter of Henry Lindall
 Elizabeth Hoyt, who married Samuel Sension, son of his sister-in-law, Mary Tinker Sension and brother-in-law Mathias Sension(St. John, Senchon)
 Hannah Hoyt, who married Judah Gregory
 Zerubbabel Hoyt (1652–1739), who married Hannah Knapp (1642–1696)

Honors
Hoyt's Hill, named after Walter Hoyt, is the historical name of the hill in the Green at the northeast corner of East Avenue and Willow Street. The place name dates back at least as early as 1679.

He is listed on the Founders Stone bearing the names of the founding settlers of Norwalk in the East Norwalk Historical Cemetery.

References 

1618 births
1698 deaths
American Puritans
Connecticut city council members
Deputies of the Connecticut General Assembly (1662–1698)
Deputies of the Connecticut General Court (1639–1662)
People from Taunton Deane (district)
People from Windsor, Connecticut
Founding settlers of Norwalk, Connecticut